The list of ship commissionings in 2015 includes a chronological list of all ships commissioned in 2015.


References

2015